= FENDRR =

Non-coding RNA in the species Homo sapiens

Identifiers
- Aliases: FENDRR, FOXF1-AS1, TCONS_00024240, lincFOXF1, onco-lncRNA-21, FOXF1 adjacent non-coding developmental regulatory RNA, FOXF1AS1
- External IDs: OMIM: 614975; GeneCards: FENDRR

Gene location (Human)
Chr.	Chromosome 16 (human)
Band	16q24.1	Start	86,474,529 bp
Band	16q24.1	End	86,509,099 bp
RNA expression pattern
Bgee	Human / Mouse (ortholog); Top expressed in: right lung; muscle layer of sigmoid colon; gastric mucosa; epithelium of colon; upper lobe of left lung; transverse colon; rectum; urinary bladder; gallbladder; body of stomach / n/a; More reference expression data
BioGPS	n/a
Orthologs
Databases	NCBI: entry; OMA: entry
Species	Human	Mouse
Entrez	400550	n/a
Ensembl	ENSG00000268388	n/a
UniProt	n a	n/a
RefSeq (mRNA)	n/a	n/a
RefSeq (protein)	n/a	n/a
Location (UCSC)	Chr 16: 86.47 – 86.51 Mb	n/a
PubMed search		n/a
- Wikidata
View/Edit Human

FOXF1 adjacent non-coding developmental regulatory RNA is a long non-coding RNA that in humans is encoded by the FENDRR gene.

== Function ==
This gene produces a spliced long non-coding RNA transcribed bidirectionally with FOXF1 on the opposite strand. A similar gene in mouse is essential for normal development of the heart and body wall. The encoded transcript is thought to act by binding to polycomb repressive complex 2 (PRC2) and/or TrxG/MLL complexes to promote the methylation of the promoters of target genes, thus reducing their expression. It has been suggested that this transcript may play a role in the progression of gastric cancer. Alternatively spliced transcript variants have been identified.
